Francis Kahata Nyambura (born 4 May 1996) is a Kenyan footballer . He plays as a left midfielder and an attacking midfielder he has appeared for the Kenya national team.

Career

KF Tirana
Kahata joined KF Tirana from Thika United on a six-month loan deal in January 2014 with the hope of using the Albanian club as a stepping stone to move to a bigger European club. He joined the club with some others foreign players like Gilberto and Selemani Ndikumana, who were vital to Tirana's survival in the Albanian Superliga.

On 20 January, Kahata began training with Tirana and made his debut for the side on 1 February, playing the full 90 minutes in a goalless draw against Kastrioti. Six days later, Kahata played 55 minutes during 1–0 win over cross-town rivals Partizani Tirana at the Qemal Stafa Stadium. On 29 March, he scored his first goal in Albania in a 2–0 victory over KF Laçi. A week later, he was again decisive for his team, scoring the first goal in an eventual 3–2 away win against defending champions Skënderbeu Korçë. He scored in a third consecutive match against KS Lushnja on 12 April, which proved to be the winner.

Kahata left KF Tirana at the end of his six-month loan deal as his parent club Thika United would not agree to let the player leave on a free transfer as he still had another six months left on his contract, which ended on 31 December 2014. There was also a contract dispute between the player and KF Tirana over US$7,000 in wages that were not paid by the club despite begin contracted to do so. On 20 January 2015, however, it was announced that he rejoined the club on a permanent deal, before leaving the club again after the 2014–15 season.

In July 2015 Kahata signed for Kenyan Premier League Club Gor Mahia Nairobi.
He scored an important goal against western stima.
On 18 April 2018 he scored a crucial against South African side Super Sport United which sent Gor Mahia to the CAF confederation cup group stages.he joined simba fc in July 2019

International goals
Scores and results list Kenya's goal tally first.

References

External links
 
 
 Francis Kahata at Footballdatabase

1991 births
Living people
People from Kiambu County
Association football midfielders
Kenyan footballers
Thika United F.C. players
University of Pretoria F.C. players
KF Tirana players
Gor Mahia F.C. players
Simba S.C. players
Kategoria Superiore players
Kenya international footballers
2019 Africa Cup of Nations players
Kenyan expatriate footballers
Kenyan expatriate sportspeople in South Africa
Kenyan expatriate sportspeople in Albania
Kenyan expatriate sportspeople in Tanzania
Expatriate soccer players in South Africa
Expatriate footballers in Albania
Expatriate footballers in Tanzania
Tanzanian Premier League players